Hampstead Academy is a private, independent, STEM and STEAM, day school situated on a wooded  campus in southeastern New Hampshire. Established in 1978, Hampstead Academy is approved by the New Hampshire State Department of Education and Health and Human Services (DHHS), and is fully accredited by New England Association of Schools and Colleges (NEASC) and is SEVIS certified. Located on 320 East Road, Hampstead, the school serves students in Preschool through Grade 8.

Subjects taught
 Language Arts - Guided Reading, Literature-Based, Process Writing, Poetry, Journals, Publishing, Grammar, Study Skills
 Mathematics - Concepts, Computation, Problem Solving, Computer Enhanced Applications, Algebra, Geometry
 Science - STEM/STEAM based program, Earth, Life, Physical, Environmental, Hands-on Labs, Nature Trail
 Social Studies - American/World History, Geography, Current Events, Field Trips
 Technology - is integrated throughout the curriculum with emphasis on research/media fluency, digital citizenship, programming concepts, internet use and safety, coding, video production, keyboarding. 
 Creative Arts - Fine Arts, Performing Arts, Music, Chorus, Orchestra, Instrument Lessons
 Foreign Language - Spanish, Chinese, Latin
 Library - Literacy, Research Skills, Storytelling, Storytime
 Physical Education - Health and Nutrition, Fitness, Sports, Personal Development, Yoga
 Electives - Crafts, Running, Yoga, Orienteering, Math Counts, Math League, Lego League, Drama, Robotics, Sea Perch
 MakerSpace - Integrating Science, Technology Engineering, Art and Mathematics

Athletics
Hampstead Academy offers a variety of in-school and after-school sports activities. The program includes Soccer, Cross Country, Swimming, Volleyball, Basketball, Skiing, Baseball and Golf.

Enrichment programs
Throughout the year, after-school enrichment activities and sports are offered for students' interest and enjoyment. Some of the activities take place on school grounds, while others are at off-campus locations. Hampstead Academy's after-school sports program includes intramural sports, soccer, baseball, bowling,  cross country, swimming, basketball, skiing, snowboarding and golf. Other enrichment programs offered include SSAT preparation, Improvisational Theater, Drama Club, Student Council, Yearbook Club, Chinese Club, Destination ImagiNation, Lego League, STEM, Chess, SeaPerch, Orchestra, Chorus and Instrument lessons.

External links
 Official website

Educational institutions established in 1978
Private middle schools in New Hampshire
Private elementary schools in New Hampshire
Schools in Rockingham County, New Hampshire
1978 establishments in New Hampshire
Hampstead, New Hampshire